Comic actor and singer-songwriter Adam Sandler has been honored with many awards and nominations for his work in film and recordings. As of April 2018, he has been nominated for 120 awards, winning 46.

Major associations

Golden Globe Awards

Grammy Awards

Primetime Emmy Awards

Independent Spirit Awards

Screen Actors Guild Awards

Other awards and nominations

Annie Awards

Boston Society of Film Critics

CinemaCon Awards

Critics' Choice Movie Awards

Golden Raspberry Awards

Gijón International Film Festival

Gotham Independent Film Awards

Hollywood Film Awards

MTV Movie & TV Awards

National Board of Review

Nickelodeon Kids' Choice Awards

People's Choice Awards

Teen Choice Awards

See also
Adam Sandler filmography

References

External links 
Awards received by Adam Sandler at the IMDb

Awards
Sandler, Adam
Sandler, Adam